We Know What You're Up To is the debut studio album by Rogue Traders. It was released by Vicious Grooves, Virgin in Australia on 5 May 2003 (see 2003 in music). After disappointing sales and poor publicity, Rogue Traders was dropped from the label. "One of My Kind" became a Top 10 hit in Australia, the band's first hit anywhere in the world.

Track listing
"To Be Someone"
"One of My Kind" (Rogue Traders vs. INXS)
"Overload"
"Make It Better"
"Stay?"
"Broken"
"Revolution"
"Golden"
"Give in to Me"
"Take It Deeper"
"Lift this Planet"

"Need You to Show Me" was to be included on all editions of the album, but was later deleted from the album because the band didn't feel it matched the 'vibe' of the rest of the album. The song was replaced with "One of My Kind".

2003 debut albums
Rogue Traders albums